Madras Club, or Adyar Club, is a gentleman's club in the city of Chennai, India. Founded in 1832, it is the second oldest of its kind in India.

History 

The Madras Club was founded on 15 May 1832 as a European men-only club. Its first President was one H. Chamier. The Adyar Club was founded in 1890. In contrast to the Madras Club, the Adyar Club gave membership to women. Originally started as a Europeans-only club, the Adyar Club started admitting Indians as members in 1960. The two clubs merged in 1963 under the name "Madras Club". Since the merger, the Madras Club has been admitting Indians as its members.

The Civilian's South India, in its 1921 issue, considered the Madras Club to be the best of its kind in the country

Headquarters 

The Express Estate, which now houses the Express Avenue shopping mall, was till 1947, the original home of the Madras Club. The club moved to Adyar in 1963 and is still based there.

Notes

External links 
 Official website

Clubs and societies in India
Organisations based in Chennai
1832 establishments in British India
Organizations established in 1832